General elections were held in Senegal on 1 December 1963. It was the first time the President had been directly elected.  However, incumbent Léopold Sédar Senghor of the Senegalese Progressive Union (UPS) was the only candidate, and was re-elected unopposed. The UPS also won all 80 seats in the National Assembly with 94.2% of the vote. Voter turnout was around 86% for the presidential election and 90% for the Assembly election.

Results

President

National Assembly

References

Further reading

Senegal
Elections in Senegal
1963 in Senegal
Single-candidate elections
Presidential elections in Senegal
December 1963 events in Africa